BR-365 is a Brazilian federal highway that begins in Montes Claros, Minas Gerais and ends in São Simão in the state of Goiás.

Duplications

The highway is duplicated in a few parts near Uberlândia. The stretch between Uberlândia and the junction with BR-153 was doubled between 2010 and 2020. In 2020, there was also a forecast to double between the junction with BR-153 and Ituiutaba.

Economic importance 

The BR-365 has its greatest economic importance through the flow of agricultural production from Minas Gerais. It also promotes regional and state integration, facilitates tourism to the beaches of Espírito Santo and the Northeast Region, among others.  Via the BR-365, grain from the Center-West region travels to the Port of Santos, and the route is used to supply the southern region of Goiás and Minas Gerais, among others, with industry products, building materials and food.

Gallery

References

Federal highways in Brazil